Joseph Wharton (born in Philadelphia, Pennsylvania, August 4, 1707; died there on July 27, 1776) was a successful American merchant, and the owner of "Walnut Grove," a country place on Fifth street, near Washington Avenue, Philadelphia, on which the Mischianza of 1778 was held.  The house was the finest of its day near that city. It was torn down in 1862, to make room for a schoolhouse. He was called "Duke Wharton", because of his stately bearing.

Family
He was the uncle of Pennsylvania governor Thomas Wharton Jr. and father of Continental Congressman Samuel Wharton, Philadelphia mayor Robert Wharton, and United States Marine Corps commandant Franklin Wharton.  He married Hannah Carpenter (1711–1751) and after her death Hannah Owen (1720–1791), a widow.

Joseph Wharton; 1st marriage, Philada. March 5, 1729–30, Hannah, daughter of John Carpenter, by his wife, Ann Hoskins. She was born in Philada. Nov. 23, 1711, and deceased on July 14, 1751. He married secondly, on June 7, 1752, with Hannah, widow of John Ogden, and daughter of Robert Owen, by his wife, Susannah Hudson. She was born in Philadelphia on March 16, 1720–1, and died in Jan. 1791.
By his 1st wife he had eleven children, all born in Philadelphia.

Thomas (b. Jan. 15, 1730–1); m. Rachel Medcalf. 
Samuel (b. May 3, 1732); m. Sarah Lewis. 
Joseph (b. March 21, 1733–4); m. Sarah Tallman. 
Rachel (b. June 7, 1736); bu. Jan. 6, 1736–7). 
John (b. Jan. 17, 1737–8; d.-1770). 
William (b. March 12, 1740); m. Oct. 15, 1767, Susannah, daughter of Jacob Medcalf by his wife Susannah Hudson, b. June 6, 1734, He d. s. p. Will proved, Philada. Jan. 21, 1805. 
George (b. March 13, 1741–2; bu. March 17, 1741–2). 
Charles (b. Jan. 11, 1743–4); m. 1st, Jemima Edwards; 2dly, Elizabeth Richardson; and Sdly, Hannah Redwood. 
Isaac (b. Sept. 15, 1745; March 31, 1808); m. Margaret Rawle. 
Carpenter (b. Aug. 30, 1747; d. April 6, 1780); m. Elizabeth Davis, who d. May, 1816. They marriage in Christ Church, April 13, 1771.
Benjamin (b. Feb. 12, 1749–50; d. Sept. 8, 1754).

References

External links
Image of Walnut Grove at virtualology.com

1707 births
1776 deaths
People of colonial Pennsylvania
Businesspeople from Philadelphia
Wharton family
18th-century merchants
Colonial American merchants
18th-century American businesspeople